Nete, also known as Bisorio, Malamauda, or Iniai, is an Engan language spoken in Papua New Guinea.

Classification 
Glottolog classifies Nete and Bisorio as two languages within Outer Engan, a divergent group situated northward across the Central Range from the main Engan-speaking area, located in Enga Province. The purported language Bikaru, spoken at the head of the Korosamen River adjacent to the Nete dialect-speaking area, is a dialect of Bisorio fully mutually intelligible with the rest of the language.

Geography 
Villages where Nete is spoken include Malaumanda, Anamanda, Lodon, Onge, Kasakali, Takop, Hulipa, Yaipo, Bake, Nai, Onon, Limbia and Menagus.

Bibliography
Word lists of Bisorio
Conrad, Robert J. and Ronald K. Lewis. 1988 Some language and sociolinguistic relationships in the Upper Sepik region of Papua New Guinea. In: Smith et al. 243–273.
Davies, John and Bernard Comrie. 1985. A linguistic survey of the Upper Yuat. In: Adams et al., 275–312.

References

External links 
 Rosetta Project: Nete Swadesh List, Bisorio Swadesh List, Bikaru Swadesh List

Engan languages
Languages of East Sepik Province
Severely endangered languages